The Bank of England Act 1694 (5 & 6 Will & Mar c 20), sometimes referred to as the Tonnage Act 1694, is an Act of the Parliament of England. It is one of the Bank of England Acts 1694 to 1892.

Sections 1 to 15 and 22 to 24 and 33 and 35 to 48 were repealed by the Statute Law Revision Act 1867.

Sections 16 and 18 were repealed by the Statute Law Revision Act 1966.

Sections 21 and 32 and 34 were repealed by section 8 of, and Part I of the Schedule to, the Bank Act 1892.

Section 25 was repealed by Schedule 3 to the Bank of England Act 1946.

Section 28 was repealed by Part XI of Schedule 1 to, the Statute Law (Repeals) Act 1976.

Sections 29 to 31 were repealed by Schedule 1 to the Statute Law Revision Act 1948.

References
Halsbury's Statutes,

External links

The Bank of England Act 1694, as amended, from Legislation.gov.uk.

Acts of the Parliament of England
1694 in law
Bank of England
1694 in England
Banking legislation in the United Kingdom
1694 in economics